Roberto Guerra (born 18 September 1979) is a Cuban boxer. He competed in the men's welterweight event at the 2000 Summer Olympics.

References

1979 births
Living people
Cuban male boxers
Olympic boxers of Cuba
Boxers at the 2000 Summer Olympics
Place of birth missing (living people)
Welterweight boxers